Ron Atanasio is an American former professional soccer player who played as a forward.

Early and personal life
Atanasio was born and grew up in Oceanside, New York, where he attended Oceanside High School.

Career
Atanasio played in the North American Soccer League for the New York Cosmos and the Houston Hurricane; in the Major Indoor Soccer League for the Houston Summit and the New York Arrows; in the American Soccer League for the Detroit Express; and in the United Soccer League for the Charlotte Gold and the Fort Lauderdale Sun.

References

American soccer players
American Soccer League (1933–1983) players
Charlotte Gold players
Detroit Express (1981–1983) players
Fort Lauderdale Sun players
Houston Hurricane players
Houston Summit players
Living people
Major Indoor Soccer League (1978–1992) players
New York Arrows players
New York Cosmos players
United Soccer League (1984–85) players
1956 births
Adelphi Panthers men's soccer players
North American Soccer League (1968–1984) players
People from Oceanside, New York
Soccer players from New York (state)
Association football forwards